The Islas Los Frailes are an archipelago of rock islets with sparse scrub vegetation belonging to the Federal dependencies of Venezuela, part of Venezuela.

The flotilla of Spanish explorer Alonso de Ojeda sighted in 1499 the archipelago composed of ten islands: 
 Chepere 
 Guacaraida 
 Isla Fraile Grande
 Nabobo
 Cominoto 
 Macarare 
 Guairiare 
 Guacaraida 
 La Balandra
 La Peche

See also
Federal Dependencies of Venezuela
List of marine molluscs of Venezuela
List of Poriferans of Venezuela

References

External links

 Los Frailes; hfdx.org

Los Frailes
Venezuelan islands of the Leeward Antilles